Double Deal is a 1939 American drama with an all-black cast (a genre at the time called "race films"), written by Arthur Hoerl, produced by George Randol, directed by Arthur Dreifuss and released on the independent states-rights market by Sack Amusement Enterprises and Astor Pictures Corp.

Plot summary
Two men, Tommy McCoy and Dude Markey, are in love with Nita, a beautiful nightclub singer/dancer. Markey robs a jewelry store and gives the haul to a local gangster. Later, he steals the jewelry from the gangster's safe and frames McCoy for the robbery in the hope that the gangster will kill him, thereby getting rid of his rival for the lovely Nita.

Cast

Monte Hawley as Jim McCoy
Jeni Le Gon as Nita
Edward Thompson as Dude Markey
Florence O'Brien as Sally
Freddie Jackson as Tommy McCoy
Buck Woods
Maceo Bruce Sheffield as Murray Howard
Charles Hawkins
Jack Clisby
Tom Southern
Vernon McCalla
Charles Gordon as Lanny
Arthur Ray
F.E. Miller as Nightclub Comedian
Shelton Brooks as Singer in Nightclub Floorshow
Juanita Moore as Nightclub Patron

Soundtrack
Shelton Brooks - "Hole in the Wall" (Written by Shelton Brooks)
"Jitterbugs Cuttin' Rugs" (Written by Shelton Brooks)
"Gettin' in Right with You" (Written by Peter Tinturin and Harry Tobias)

External links

1939 films
1939 comedy-drama films
American black-and-white films
American comedy-drama films
Race films
Films directed by Arthur Dreifuss
1930s English-language films
1930s American films